The Serbian Cross is a national symbol of Serbia, part of the coat of arms and flag of Serbia, and of the Serbian Orthodox Church. It is based on the tetragrammic cross emblem/flag of the Byzantine Palaiologos dynasty, with the difference that in Serbian use the cross is usually white on a red background, rather than gold on a red background (though it can be depicted in gold as well). 

It is composed of a cross symbol with four "fire striker" shapes, originally four Greek letters beta (Β).

Serbian tradition attributes the letters to Saint Sava, the 13th-century Metropolitan of Žiča and Archbishop of the Serbs. Popular tradition also interprets the four "fire striker" shapes as four Cyrillic letters "S"  (С), for the motto Samo sloga Srbina spasava (meaning "Only Unity Saves the Serbs"). The double-headed eagle and the cross are the main heraldic symbols which have represented the national identity of the Serb people across the centuries.

History

Middle Ages

Crosses with firesteels have been used since Roman times, as symbols, but not as coats of arms or emblems. Some historians connect it with the labarum, the Imperial flag of Constantine the Great (r. 306–337). In the 6th century the cross with four fields (with either letters or heraldry) appear on Byzantine coins. The symbol was adopted by the First Crusaders since the first event, People's Crusade (1096). 

Michael VIII Palaiologos (1261–1282) adopted the symbol when he resurrected the Byzantine Empire, with the initials (letters β) of the imperial motto of the Palaiologos dynasty: King of Kings (=Jesus Christ), help the King. 
It was used in flags and coins.  The symbol appear on the Imperial flag divellion (διβελλιον) used in front of all other banners, recorded by Pseudo-Kodinos ( 1347–68) wrongly as "a cross with firesteels", and depicted in the Castilian Conosçimiento de todos los reynos atlas ( 1350).  As Alexander Soloviev writes, the use of letters in western heraldry is nonexistent.

The oldest preserved historical source of the cross used in Serbia is from the Dečani oil-lamp (Dečanski polijelej), which was a gift to King Stefan Milutin (r. 1282–1321), the ktetor (founder) of Visoki Dečani, now preserved at the Monastery of Prohor Pčinjski.

Stojan Novaković argued that the recorded use of the Serbian cross, as a national symbol, began in 1397, during the rule of Stefan Lazarević. It was possibly derived from the Dečani polijelej. Serbian historian Stanoje Stanojević argued that it entered its use in 1345, with Stefan Dušan's elevation to Emperor. In the Middle Ages, both the "Greek style", with closed fire-steels (β–B), and the "Serbian syle", with open fire-steels (C-S), were used in Serbia. 

A 1439 map by Gabriel de Vallseca used both the Serbian cross and eagle when depicting Serbia.

Early modern and modern history
 
In South Slavic heraldic sources (also known as "Illyrian Armorials"), the Serbian cross is found in the Korenić-Neorić Armorial (1595), which shows the coat of arms of Serbia (Svrbiae) as a white cross over a red background, with four firesteels, also depicting the Mrnjavčević noble house with the same design, with inverted colours and the Serbian eagle in the center of the cross. According to Mavro Orbini (1607), it was used by Vukašin Mrnjavčević (King, 1365–1371) and Lazar Hrebeljanović (Prince, 1371–1389). Next, it is found in the Belgrade Armorial II (ca. 1600–1620), the Fojnica Armorial (between 1675 and 1688), the Armorial of Stanislaus Rubcich (ca. 1700), and Stemmatographia (1741), while still continuing to be used in foreign heraldic sources. 

The Metropolitanate of Karlovci, established in 1691, adopted it in its seal.

After the Serbian Revolution, the Serbian cross then appeared on all official Serbian coats of arms, except the Serbian coat of arms adopted in 1947, which had the cross removed, leaving four stylized S; this was done symbolically by the Yugoslav government to "socially curtail and politically marginalize religious communities and religion in general". During WWII, The Serbian cross was used in the Nazi backed puppet government, Government of National Salvation Flag (1941–1944). Miloš Obrenović adopted the Serbian cross as the military flag when forming the first units of the regular army in 1825.

The double-headed eagle and the cross are the main heraldic symbols which represent the national identity of the Serbian people, and the Serbian cross symbol has been frequently used in Serb heraldry.

Serbian popular tradition attributes the symbol to St. Sava, 12th century metropolitan of Žiča and Archbishop of Serbs. St. Sava is also associated with the motto Only Unity Saves the Serbs.

The memorial park in Tekeriš, where the first battle of World War I was fought, the monument has "18-VIII-1914" and Samo sloga srbina spasava inscribed. A monument in Šamac, Republika Srpska, Bosnia-Herzegovina for the Serbs who fought and died in the Bosnian war, has the Serbian eagle in the center, the years which the war occurred (1992-1995) and Samo sloga Srbina spasava on the left and right sides.

Contemporary use

Gallery
Historical coats of arms and flags

Cities and municipalities in Serbia

Cities and municipalities in Bosnia and Herzegovina - Republic of Srpska

Cities and municipalities elsewhere

Sports

Other uses

See also
Coat of Arms of Serbia
Flag of Serbia

References

Sources

External links

Crosses by culture
Serbian culture
National symbols of Serbia
Crosses in heraldry
History of the Serbs